The Decision of 1789 refers to a month-long constitutional debate that occurred during the first session of the United States House of Representatives as to whether Article Two of the United States Constitution granted the president the power to remove officers of the United States at will. It has been called "the first significant legislative construction of the Constitution". The debate centered around "a bill that would create a Department of Foreign Affairs"—the precursor to the Department of State—and which branch of government would have the power to remove officers from that department.

Congress ultimately enacted three departmental acts "that contained nearly identical language", none of which contained language expressly granting the President removal power. Nonetheless, one of those acts included a proviso urged by James Madison that many scholars believe "was meant to imply recognition that the Secretary would be removable by the President at will". Justices of the Supreme Court and legal scholars continue to debate the legal significance of the decision.

Debate over constitutional meaning 
Some of the United States' leading figures have used the decision as support for presidential removal power. Writing as Pacificus, Alexander Hamilton stated that the Decision of 1789 construed the Constitution as placing full executive removal power with the President. This view was supported by Chief Justice John Marshall in his biography of George Washington. In Myers v. United States, Chief Justice William H. Taft, writing for the majority, used the Decision of 1789 as support for broad presidential removal powers. More recently, Chief Justice John Roberts used the decision in both Free Enterprise Fund v. Public Company Accounting Oversight Board (2010) and Seila Law LLC v. Consumer Financial Protection Bureau (2020) to support his construction of the President's removal power. Thus, it has been used as support in two Supreme Court cases that set precedent. 

Nonetheless, "there is considerable evidence that the framers of the Constitution themselves could not agree on the meaning or significance of constitutional language defining the appointment and removal powers of the executive branch". In Seila Law, Justice Elena Kagan challenged Roberts's characterization of the Decision of 1789, stating that "[t]he best view is that the First Congress 'was deeply divided' on the President's removal power, and 'never squarely addressed' the central issue here".

See also 
Tenure of Office Act (1820)
Tenure of Office Act (1867)

References 

1st United States Congress
1789 in New York (state)
Article Two of the United States Constitution
Political debates
United States constitutional law
United States Department of State